The 2022 Phillips 66 Big 12 Conference women's basketball tournament is the postseason tournament for the Big 12 Conference that will be held from March 10 to 13, 2021, in Kansas City, Missouri, at the Municipal Auditorium.

Seeds

Schedule

Bracket

*denotes overtime

References

External links
 2022 Phillips 66 Big 12 Conference women's basketball tournament Bracket (PDF)

2021–22 Big 12 Conference women's basketball season
Tournament
Big 12 Conference women's basketball tournament
Big 12 Conference women's basketball tournament
College sports tournaments in Missouri
Basketball competitions in Kansas City, Missouri
Women's sports in Missouri